Kara-Yakupovo (Qara Yaqup) is a rural locality (a selo) and the administrative centre of Kara-Yakupovsky Selsoviet, Chishminsky District, Bashkortostan, Russia. The population was 513 as of 2010. There are 6 streets.

Geography 
Kara-Yakupovo is located 11 km southeast of Chishmy (the district's administrative centre) by road. Gorny is the nearest rural locality.

References 

Rural localities in Chishminsky District